The 1939 Singapore Open, also known as the 1939 Singapore Badminton Championships, took place from 13 August – 5 November 1939 at the Clerical Union Hall in Balestier, Singapore. The ties were played over a few months with the first round ties being played on the 13th of August and the last (men's doubles final) been played on 5 November. There was no women's doubles competition due to the lack of entries.

Venue
Clerical Union Hall

Final results

References 

Singapore Open (badminton)
1939 in badminton